Lyme or LYME may refer to:

 Lyme disease, an infectious disease carried by ticks caused by bacteria of the genus Borrelia

Places

United Kingdom
 Lyme, an alternative name of Lyme Handley, a civil parish in Cheshire
 Lyme Park, an estate in Cheshire
 Lyme Regis, a town in Dorset commonly known as Lyme
 Lyme Bay, an area of the English Channel
 Lyme Brook, tributary stream of the River Trent, Staffordshire
 Forest of Lyme, a historic area of forest covering parts of Cheshire, Derbyshire, and Staffordshire

United States
 Lyme, Connecticut, a town in southeastern Connecticut, the namesake of Lyme disease
 Old Lyme, Connecticut, a neighboring town
 East Lyme, Connecticut, a neighboring town
 Lyme, New Hampshire, a town in western New Hampshire
 Lyme, New York, a town in New York along the Lake Ontario shoreline
 Lyme Township, Huron County, Ohio, a small town in northern Ohio

Other places
 Lyme Park, Gauteng, a suburb of Johannesburg, South Africa

Ships
 English ship Lyme (1654), 52-gun third rate Speaker-class frigate built at Portsmouth, launched in 1654
 HMS Lyme, any of several vessels of the British Royal Navy
 RFA Lyme Bay (L3007), a landing ship dock of the British Royal Fleet Auxiliary
 Lyme-class frigate, class of two 24-gun sixth-rate frigates of the Royal Navy

People
 David Lyme (born 1966), also known as Jordi Cubino, a Catalan singer, songwriter, and model

Other uses
 LYME (software bundle), a solution stack consisting of Linux, Yaws, Mnesia, and Erlang
 Lyme Art Association, arts organization established in 1914, with roots going back to 1902
 Lyme-grass or Leymus arenarius

See also
 Ashton-under-Lyme, a market town in Tameside, Greater Manchester, England
 Newcastle-under-Lyme, a town and borough in Staffordshire, England
 Lyme and Cybelle, a male and female American folk/pop duo of the mid 1960s
 New Lyme (disambiguation), several towns in the United States
 Lime (disambiguation)
 Flyme (disambiguation)
 Glyme (disambiguation)
 Uplyme